Vittorio Faroppa (29 August 1887 – 11 November 1958) was an Italian footballer who played as a goalkeeper. On 17 March 1912, he represented the Italy national football team on the occasion of a friendly match against France in a 4–3 home loss.

References

1887 births
1958 deaths
Italian footballers
Italy international footballers
Association football goalkeepers
Juventus F.C. players
Genoa C.F.C. managers
Udinese Calcio managers
Italian football managers